Olexandr Shevelev (born 2 December 1987) is a Ukrainian professional handball player for Greek club AEK Athens and the Ukrainian national team.

He represented Ukraine at the 2020 European Men's Handball Championship.

References

External links

1987 births
Living people
Ukrainian male handball players
Sportspeople from Zaporizhzhia
Expatriate handball players
Ukrainian expatriate sportspeople in Belarus
Ukrainian expatriate sportspeople in North Macedonia
Ukrainian expatriate sportspeople in Russia
Ukrainian expatriate sportspeople in Spain
HC Motor Zaporizhia players
Liga ASOBAL players
BM Ciudad Real players
21st-century Ukrainian people